Matteo Eydallin (born 6 November 1985) is an Italian ski mountaineer.

Eydallin was born in Turin and lives in Sauze d'Oulx. In 2003, when he started ski mountaineering, he competed first in the Trofeo Bozzetti event and became a member of the national selection.

Selected results 
 2005:
 1st, European Championship single "juniors" race
 1st, European Championship "juniors" vertical race
 2009:
 1st, European Championship team race (together with Denis Trento)
 1st, Tour du Rutor (together with Denis Trento)
 1st, Trofeo "Rinaldo Maffeis" (together with Denis Trento)
 1st, Trofeo Mezzalama (together with Manfred Reichegger and Denis Trento)
 2nd, Pierra Menta (together with Denis Trento)
 2nd, Valtellina Orobie World Cup race
 2010:
 5th, World Championship single race
 2011:
 1st, World Championship team race, together with Denis Trento
 1st, World Championship relay, together with Manfred Reichegger, Robert Antonioli and Denis Trento
 1st, Tour du Rutor, together with Denis Trento
 2012:
 3rd, European Championship relay, together with Damiano Lenzi, Manfred Reichegger and Robert Antonioli
 6th, European Championship single
 6th, European Championship team, together with Denis Trento

Patrouille des Glaciers 

 2010: 2nd, together with Pietro Lanfranchi and Manfred Reichegger

Pierra Menta 

 2009: 2nd, together with Denis Trento
 2011: 3rd, together with Denis Trento
 2012: 2nd, together with Denis Trento

External links 
 Matteo Eydallin bei Skimountaineering.org

References 

1985 births
Living people
Italian male ski mountaineers
World ski mountaineering champions
Sportspeople from Turin
Ski mountaineers of Gruppo Sportivo Esercito
People from Sauze d'Oulx